Sinuca brasileira (Portuguese for Brazilian snooker), often simply called sinuca, is a cue sport played on a snooker table, using only one  instead of snooker's fifteen, with the normal six  of the standard set of snooker balls. Each ball carries the same basic  value as in snooker.  As  with other pocket billiards games, a white  is used to  the red and other coloured balls. The game is played almost exclusively in Brazil and is little known outside this region.

Rules
Ball values are the same as in standard snooker (red = 1,  = 2,  = 3,  = 4,  = 5,  = 6,  = 7) and points are awarded to a player after the corresponding ball is legally potted.

The colours are set up on their normal  as in snooker, while the sole red ball is placed halfway between the pink ball and the right side . The opening player may move the ball anywhere within the "D" before playing. The first shot must be played so that the red ball is contacted; however, it is not permitted to either pocket the red ball or leave the opponent snookered. The opponent then has choice of shot.

Taken in turns, each player has a choice to either take a free shot (shoot for the ball on the table with the lowest point value) or a penalty shot (shoot for any other ball).

If a free shot is made, the player is awarded the ball's point value, the ball remains off the table, and the player can choose any remaining ball on the table as a second free shot; if that ball is made, the player receives its point value and the ball is respotted. A miss on a free shot incurs no penalty, but does end the player's turn. 

If a penalty shot is chosen, and the shot is made, the player is awarded the ball's point value and the ball is respotted. If a penalty shot is missed, it constitutes a foul and the opponent is awarded 7 points.

All other rules are the same as in snooker, although  ,  and other combination shots are automatically illegal because all the balls are different colours.

Sinuca brasileira plus 

The rules for it are the same as before.

References

Snooker variants
Sports originating in Brazil